Altitude is the third and final full-length album by the band Yellow Second, released on March 8, 2005 by Floodgate Records. Altitude was the only Yellow Second album to receive distribution via a major label, making it the band's most prevalent and well-known album.

Track listing
"Silhouette" – 3:19
"Chance of Sunbreaks" – 3:41
"Forget What You've Heard" – 4:07
"Material" – 3:39
"Plume" – 4:01
"Mulberry" – 3:53
"Some Other Way" – 2:53
"Gravity Boots" - 3:21
"Seed" – 3:58
"Fall Out of Line" – 4:16
"Hello To Never" – 4:29
"I Can Awake" – 3:57
"Imaginary Friend" – 4:10

Credits
Scott Kerr - vocals, guitar, Synthesizer
Josh Hemingway - guitar
Brett Bowden/John Warne - bass guitar
Andy Verdecchio - drums

References

2005 albums
Yellow Second albums